The discography of the Bangladeshi rock band Love Runs Blind (often abbreviated as LRB) consists of fourteen studio albums, one live album, five music downloads, two compilation albums, fifteen music videos and appeared on six mixed albums. Formed in Chittagong in 1991, their first lineup consisted of vocalist and guitarist Ayub Bachchu, keyboardist S.I. Tutul, bass guitarist Saidul Hasan Swapan and drummer Habib Anwar Joy. Their first studio album LRB I and LRB II was released in 1992 and was a double album, which was the first ever double album in Bangladesh.

Love Runs Blind's third studio album Shukh was released in 1993, and is their most commercially successful album. The album contained hit songs like "চলো বদলে যায় (Let's Change)", "রুপালি গিটার (Silver Guitar)", "গতকাল রাতে (Last Night)" and "কী আশাতে? (What to Expect)". Their fourth studio album Tobuo was released in 1994. The album was not well received by fans and did not contain that much hit songs like the previous one. But, it cemented them as a hard rock band, as their previous albums had contained soft rock and pop rock songs. Their fifth album Ghumonto Shohore was released in 1995 and was a massive hit. The self titled track was a great hit and is considered as one of the classic Love Runs Blind song. They released their sixth studio album Shopno in 1996. In September 1996, they released a live album name, Ferari Mon: Unplugged Live which was the first ever live album in Bangladesh and the only live album of the band. They released another double album in 1998: Amader and Bishmoy.

In 1999, frontman Bachchu set up his own studio AB Kitchen, which shortly became a record label. They released Mon Chaile Mon Pabe from Soundtek in 2001 which was recorded in AB Kitchen. Their 2003 album Ochena Jibon was the last one to feature founding member S.I. Tutul. They added another guitarist, Abdullah al Masud in the lineup the same year. Their twelfth studio album Sporsho (2007) had included a few heavy metal numbers. In their last two album Juddho (2012) and Rakhe Allah Mare Ke (2016) also had heavy metal numbers and was their first album released in digital platform. In October 2018, founding member Ayub Bachchu died and in April 2019 they announced Balam Jahangir as their new lead vocalist and rhythm guitarist.

Studio albums

Live album

Music videos

References 
General

 "Love Runs Blind discography". Official website
 "LRB (Love Runs Blind) on Bangla Band" Bangla Band Music Digital Archive - Bangla Band
 "LRB - New Songs, Playlist & Latest News". BBC Music
 "Best Love Runs Blind songs". The Top Tens
 "Music videos by Love Runs Blind". YouTube

Specific

Discographies of Bangladeshi artists
Rock music group discographies